Elizabeth C. Economy (born 27 December 1962) is an American writer, foreign policy analyst, and expert on China's politics and foreign policy. She has taught undergraduates and postgraduates at Columbia University, Johns Hopkins University's Paul H. Nitze School of Advanced International Studies, and the University of Washington's Jackson School of International Studies. She is Senior Foreign Advisor to the Secretary of Commerce for the Biden administration, Senior Fellow at the Hoover Institution at Stanford University, and Senior Fellow for China studies at the Council on Foreign Relations (CFR). She was C.V. Starr Senior Fellow and Director for Asia Studies at the CFR for more than a decade. She serves on the board of managers of Swarthmore College and the board of trustees of The Asia Foundation, and is a member of the Aspen Strategy Group.

Career 
In 1994, Economy completed her PhD in Political Science at the University of Michigan.

From 2008 to 2014, she served as a member and then Vice Chair of the World Economic Forum (WEF)'s Global Agenda Council on the Future of China. From 2014 to 2016, she served as a member of the WEF's Global Agenda Council on the US.

In 2008, she received an honorary doctor of laws degree from Vermont Law School.

Works

Books 

 The Internationalization of Environmental Protection (Cambridge University Press, with Miranda Schreurs, 1997)
 China Joins the World: Progress and Prospects (Council on Foreign Relations Press, with Michel Oksenberg, 1999)
 The River Runs Black: The Environmental Challenge to China's Future (Cornell University Press, 2004)
 By All Means Necessary: How China's Resource Quest is Changing the World (Oxford University Press, 2014, with Michael Levi)
 The Third Revolution: Xi Jinping and the New Chinese State (Oxford University Press, 2018)
 The World According to China (Polity, 2021)

Selected article 

 "The Game Changer: Coping With China's Foreign Policy Revolution." Foreign Affairs (2010): 142-152.
 "China's Imperial President: Xi Jinping Tightens His Grip." Foreign Affairs 93.6 (2014): 80-91.
 "History with Chinese Characteristics: How China's Imagined Past Shapes Its Present."Foreign Affairs. 96 (2017): 141-148.
 "China's New Revolution: The Reign of Xi Jinping." Foreign Affairs. 97 (2018): 60-74.
 "The China Model: Unexceptional Exceptionalism." Essay Series of the Hoover Institution: Human Prosperity Project (2020).

External links
In this podcast, Elizabeth C. Economy and James M. Lindsay discuss Chinese president Xi Jinping and China-US relations (May 3, 2018)

References

Living people
1962 births
21st-century American non-fiction writers
American foreign policy writers
Hoover Institution people